The Wayne Municipal Auditorium in Wayne in Wayne County, Nebraska was built in 1935 as a Public Works Administration project.  It is Art Deco in style.  It was listed on the National Register of Historic Places in 2002.

It is a three-story rectangular building.  It has a large auditorium and two other meeting spaces that have served as community meeting places, as a gymnasium, a playhouse, a movie hall, and a commencement hall.

References

External links

Government buildings on the National Register of Historic Places in Nebraska
Art Deco architecture in Nebraska
Buildings and structures completed in 1935
National Register of Historic Places in Wayne County, Nebraska